"5G" is the fifth episode of the first season of the American television drama series Mad Men. It was written by series creator Matthew Weiner and directed by Lesli Linka Glatter. The episode originally aired on the AMC channel in the United States on August 16, 2007. It is the first episode to deal with the series' long-running story arc of Don's dual identities.

Plot
Don wins the "Newkie Award" for his work, and his picture appears in Advertising Age. This attracts the attention of a man named Adam Whitman, who shows up at the Sterling Cooper offices, surprising Don. Don feigns ignorance of who Adam is, and initially insists he is not Dick, the man's long-lost half brother. Adam, a janitor, is confused but later at a diner Don admits the truth, but he refuses to share any information about himself. When Don asks about the rest of the family, Adam reveals their mother Abigail has died due to cancer, to which Don coldly remarks "Good," and emphasizes that she never let him forget that she was not his mother. Don leaves without eating after telling Adam that he has no place for him in his life.

The advertising campaign Don is working on this week is for Liberty Capital Savings. He and the team come up with the idea of men opening up secret discretionary accounts that the women in their life won't know about—the Executive Account. Don is then surprised by a call from his mistress, Midge, and Peggy accidentally overhears them making plans for a nooner (sex during lunchtime).

Meanwhile, Ken Cosgrove announces that he has recently gotten a short story published in Atlantic Monthly: "Tapping a Maple on a Cold  Vermont Morning". This news causes a great deal of jealousy among Ken's co-workers. Pete is scornful of Ken, as he is from nowhere and without family of any note. Bohemian Paul is resentful, and contemplates writing a fictional story about meeting and getting along with some "negroes". Pete decides to use his connections to get a story published. He pressures his wife Trudy to visit her ex-boyfriend Charlie Fiddich, her first lover, who now works in publishing, to get him to publish a story that Pete has written. Their meeting goes awkwardly, with him trying to start an affair with Trudy, but Trudy resists his advances, and thus he only agrees to publish the story in Boys' Life. Upon hearing the news, Pete is outraged, saying that his story was good enough for The New Yorker and that Trudy should have done whatever it took to get him published there. In response, Trudy is crushed and asks him "why would you do that to me?"

While Don is with Adam, Betty and the kids arrive for a family portrait, and a desperate Peggy, thinking he is with his mistress, has to cover for his absence. She reveals the existence of the mistress to Joan, who advises her how to handle the situation.

Don receives a letter from Adam containing a room number ("5G") at a single room occupancy hotel, and a photo of the two of them when Adam was a child and Don a soldier. Don burns the photograph, then calls Adam and sets up a meeting time. At the hotel, Don coldly dismisses Adam, but gives him $5,000 to leave New York and never contact him again. Adam is heartbroken, but Don explains that he has too much to lose by revealing his past. Adam embraces him, then Don leaves, having severed all ties to his earlier life. He tells Betty that they will have to wait until they are financially able to afford a summer home.

Cultural references
Midge calls Don at work under the guise of jazz musician Bix Beiderbecke.

Reception
The episode was received positively by critics. Alan Sepinwall, writing for New Jersey's The Star-Ledger, was a fan of the episode, praising the mystery of Don's identity and writing that the subplot involving Ken's short story left him "delighted". Andrew Johnston, writing for Slant Magazine, also praised the deepening of Don's backstory, and wrote that the series was finding its voice as "a comedy of manners". Emily VanDerWerff, writing for The A.V. Club in 2013, praised the emotional core of the story, but called the episode "over-obvious and [lacking] the subtext that really makes this show sing when it's working".

References

External links
"5G" at AMC

Mad Men (season 1) episodes
2007 American television episodes
Television episodes directed by Lesli Linka Glatter